San Pedro de Atacama Airport  is a high elevation airport serving San Pedro de Atacama, a town in the Antofagasta Region of Chile.

See also

Transport in Chile
List of airports in Chile

References

External links
OpenStreetMap - San Pedro de Atacama
OurAirports - San Pedro de Atacama
FallingRain - San Pedro de Atacama Airport

Airports in Chile
Airports in Antofagasta Region